Following is a list of notable restaurants known for serving German cuisine:

External links
 

Restaurants
 
Lists of ethnic restaurants